Christophe Pélissier may refer to:
Christophe Pélissier (businessman) (1728–1779), French businessman
Christophe Pélissier (footballer) (born 1965), French manager and former footballer